The Sporting News Manager of the Year Award was established in 1936 by The Sporting News and was given annually to one manager in Major League Baseball. In 1986 it was expanded to honor one manager from each league. In 2021 the winners were Kevin Cash in the American League and Gabe Kapler in the National League.

Winners

Key

Listed below in chronological order are the MLB managers chosen as recipients of the TSN Manager of the Year Award.

1936–1985

1986–present

References

Sources
Baseball Almanac – TSN Manager of the Year Award

See also

Major League Baseball Manager of the Year Award
MLB This Year in Baseball Awards Manager of the Year
Baseball America Manager of the Year
Baseball Prospectus Internet Baseball Awards Manager of the Year
Chuck Tanner Major League Baseball Manager of the Year Award
Associated Press Manager of the Year (discontinued in 2001)
Sporting News Manager of the Decade (2009)
Sports Illustrated MLB Manager of the Decade (2009)
MLB All-Time Manager (1997; BBWAA)
MLB all-time managerial wins
Baseball awards#United States
List of MLB awards
Other Sporting News major-league baseball awards

Major League Baseball trophies and awards
Major League Baseball managers
Major League Baseball manager of the year awards
Awards established in 1936